Jirawat Sornwichian (Thai จิรวัฒน์ สอนวิเชียร), is a Thai futsal Defender, and currently a member of Thailand national futsal team.

International goals

Honours

Chonburi Blue Wave
Thailand Futsal League
Winners (5) 2009, 2012–2013, 2014, 2015, 2016

Continental

AFC Futsal Club Championship
Winners (2): 2013, 2017

International

AFC Futsal Championship
Runners up (1): 2012
Third place (1): 2016
Asian Indoor Games
Runners up (1): 2009
Third place (1): 2013
AFF Futsal Championship
Winners (6): 2008, 2009, 2012, 2013, 2014, 2015
Southeast Asian Games
Winners (2): 2011, 2013

Individual
2016 AFC Futsal Club Championship Top Scorer 7 goals
2017 AFC Futsal Club Championship Top Scorer 9 goals

References
https://web.archive.org/web/20121104010602/http://www.usm.co.th/club.php?id=27

1988 births
Living people
Futsal forwards
Jirawat Sornwichian
Jirawat Sornwichian
Jirawat Sornwichian
Southeast Asian Games medalists in futsal
Competitors at the 2011 Southeast Asian Games